Afghanistan competed at the Deaflympics for the first time during the 2017 Summer Deaflympics which was held in Samsun, Turkey. Afghani team sent a five-member delegation for the Deaflympic event held in 2017, which is the only Deaflympic event where Afghanistan took part. The five members were: Ahmad Reshad Azizi (400m), Faiz Ahmad Faizi (Taekwondo -68 kg), Ekilil Khaliqyar (200m),  Noori (100m) and Ahman Fawad Sultani (100m). Afghanistan is yet to earn a medal at the Deaflympics.

Medal tallies

Summer Deaflympics

See also 
 Afghanistan at the Olympics
 Afghanistan at the Paralympics

References 

Nations at the Deaflympics
Deaflympics
Parasports in Afghanistan
Afghanistan at the Deaflympics